William Rede (born by 1529 - at least 1569) was an English politician during the reign of Mary I of England.

Life
Rede was probably the son of the clothier Thomas Rede. He was probably the William who was from Yate, Gloucestershire and married a daughter of the clothier, Walter Bailey. He had a son, Edward Rede. In 1554, he was described as 'of Bristol', suggesting a possible connection to William Rede I.

Career
Rede was a Member of Parliament for Devizes in October 1553. He was admitted to the Middle Temple.

References

Year of death missing
English MPs 1553 (Mary I)
People from Yate
Politicians from Bristol
Members of the Middle Temple
1529 births